Haydel is a surname. Notable people with the surname include:
 Hal Haydel (1944–2018), American baseball player
 Jeremiah Haydel (born 1999), American football player

See also
 Hadl, a surname